TWA-1 is a 1300 km submarine telecommunications cable linking the United Arab Emirates, Oman, and Pakistan. The cable was launched by an Oman telecom giant Omantel and Pakistan's 
Transworld Associates along with Tyco International, United States. It is a DWDM system which is upgradeable to a capacity of 1.28 Tbit/s. It has landing points in:

 Al Seeb, Oman
 Fujairah, United Arab Emirates
 Karachi, Pakistan

Resources
 Tyco Telecommunications completes TWA-1 undersea cable system
 Large Outage in Pakistan

Submarine communications cables in the Arabian Sea
Oman–United Arab Emirates relations
Pakistan–United Arab Emirates relations
Oman–Pakistan relations